The R288 road is a regional road in Ireland. It connects the R287 and R286 roads in County Leitrim.

The R288 proceeds north via Dromahair and later along the southeast shore of Lough Gill before ending at the R286.

See also
Roads in Ireland

References

Regional roads in the Republic of Ireland
Roads in County Leitrim